Pogonopoma parahybae is a species of armored catfish endemic to Brazil where it is found in the Paraíba do Sul river basin, where it occurs in areas of mid to strong water current usually associated with rocky substrate.  This species grows to a length of  SL.

References
 

Hypostominae
Fish of South America
Fish of Brazil
Endemic fauna of Brazil
Fish described in 1877